Villefranche-de-Lauragais station (French: Gare de Villefranche-de-Lauragais) is a railway station located in Villefranche-de-Lauragais, Occitanie, southern France. Within TER Occitanie, it is part of lines 10 (Toulouse–Narbonne) and 25 (Portbou–Toulouse).

References

Railway stations in Haute-Garonne